Dividing the Light, colloquially the Pomona College skyspace, is a 2007 skyspace art installation by James Turrell at Pomona College, his alma mater. It consists of a courtyard with a fountain nestled between two academic buildings with an illuminated canopy framing the sky above.

Background
James Turrell graduated from Pomona College in 1965. Starting in the 1970s, he created a series of skyspaces that framed the sky. He was approached by the college when it was designing the Lincoln Hall and Edmunds Hall academic buildings and asked to create an installation for the Draper Courtyard located between them.

Description

Red granite benches line a partially-enclosed courtyard with a shallow black granite infinity pool. A thin brightly-colored steel canopy covers the installation, with a nearly  cutout or aperture, that contains an LED lighting array. At night, the hidden LED lights illuminate the canopy. Every hour between sunset and sunrise, they "chime", rotating through a series of colors over three minutes, and longer light shows take place daily at sunrise and sunset. The shows slightly vary with each day to match changing conditions over the course of a year. Short trees and other landscaping surround the exterior.

Construction
The work is Turrell's first public installation in Southern California. It cost  to complete. It was constructed in consultation with Marmol Radziner, AIA, and Amazing Steel. It underwent maintenance work in 2018.

Reception

The installation received critical praise. A Los Angeles Times review called it "one of the best works of public art in recent memory", lauding "Turrell's capacity to pull experiences of sensual refinement out of the heavens". Other critics noted its easy accessibility. It is associated with the Light and Space movement that originated in Southern California in the 1960s, and of which Turrell is a prominent member.

The college uses the skyspace courtyard as an event venue. Wading in the pool has been prohibited since .

See also

Prometheus
The Spirit of Spanish Music

References

External links

Pomona College Museum of Art Dividing the Light page
James Turrell Dividing the Light page

Pomona College
Installation art works
2007 in art
Works by James Turrell